Werne's Row is a row of five nearly identical Châteauesque mansions in the Old Louisville neighborhood of Louisville, Kentucky, United States. The houses were built for Joseph Werne in 1897, a prominent jeweler and antiques dealer.  Werne and his wife lived in the house overlooking the corner of 4th & Hill, while Dr. William Wathen resided in the blue house bordering Belgravia Court, The interiors of the houses were designed by Claude Balfour while the exteriors were "intrusted to Mr. F. W. Mowbray, architect", who also designed Union Station (Louisville) at 10th & Broadway in Louisville.

All five homes are very similar in style except for small ornamental features. Although only one foot apart, none of the houses touch, despite the first impression that they may be town homes. A private park for the Wernes existed behind the five houses, it has since become a parking lot for the Belgravia Court Association.

Three of the homes are subdivided into apartments, the other two remain single-family dwellings.

Images

References

19th-century buildings and structures in Louisville, Kentucky
Châteauesque architecture in the United States
Houses in Louisville, Kentucky
1897 establishments in Kentucky